"Eddie's Song" is the second and final single from British pop-punk band Son of Dork's debut and only studio album, Welcome to Loserville (2005). Released on 16 January 2006, the single peaked at number 10 on the UK Singles Chart as well as number 24 in Ireland. The single was the group's final release before being dropped by Mercury Records.

Music video
The video is fronted by ex-rhythm guitarist Dave Williams. He is seen to be a rockstar that has sex with many women, with the women quoting things in newspapers about Eddie, such as "Eddie rocks my world". The video then ends up with newspaper headlines, such as "Eddie had sex with my girlfriend". The video is of Son of Dork playing at a show. The reasoning behind the title of the song is that Son of Dork were thinking of a rock star with the first name of "Eddie", presumably the rock star Eddie Van Halen. The other meaning behind the song is to teach people to wear a condom.

Track listings
UK CD1
 "Eddie's Song" (radio edit)
 "Thunderbirds" (Busted cover)
  
UK CD2
 "Eddie's Song" (radio edit)
 "Two Princes" (Spin Doctors cover)
 "Ticket Outta Loserville" (live version)
 Enhanced section

UK DVD single
 "Eddie's Song" (audio)
 "Eddie's Song" (video with band commentary)
 "Eddie's Song" (exclusive live video and backstage footage)

Chart positions

References

Son of Dork songs
2005 songs
2006 singles
Mercury Records singles
Song recordings produced by Gil Norton
Songs written by James Bourne